Nina Sampermans (born 1993), known professionally as Ravvel, is a Belgian singer and songwriter. She is known for her work with, among others, Broiler, Hooverphonic and Gjon's Tears.

Early life and education 
Sampermans was born in Antwerp in 1993 to a sound engineer and a music teacher. In 2016, she graduated from the Codarts University for the Arts in Rotterdam, Netherlands.

Career 
Sampermans began her career as a songwriter in 2011. In early 2012, Walter Mannaerts,  and she submitted the song "Would You?" to Eurosong 2012: Een song voor Iris, the Belgian preselection for the Eurovision Song Contest 2012. The song was chosen by VRT to compete in the final, and was ultimately selected to represent Belgium in the Eurovision Song Contest 2012 with 53% of the televote.

In late 2014 and early 2015, she broke through as a singer with the single "Wild Eyes", which she had recorded with the Norwegian electronic music duo Broiler. The single peaked at the top of the VG-lista and at number 4 in the Flemish Ultratop Singles Chart. One year later, Sampermans became one of the three lead singers of the Belgian band Hooverphonic during their In Wonderland tour.

Following the cancellation of the Eurovision Song Contest 2020, Dutch composer Wouter Hardy and she co-wrote the song "Tout l'univers" for the Swiss representative Gjon's Tears at a songwriting camp in Zürich. The song was selected by a professional jury to represent Switzerland in the Eurovision Song Contest 2021. At Eurovision, the entry finished in third place with 432 points; Switzerland's best placement since 1993.

Discography

Singles

As lead artist

As featured artist

Uncredited lead vocals

Songwriting discography

Eurovision Song Contest entries

References 

1994 births
21st-century Belgian musicians
21st-century women musicians
Belgian women singers
Belgian singer-songwriters
Belgian songwriters
Living people
Musicians from Antwerp
Codarts University for the Arts alumni